NGC 5102 is a lenticular galaxy in the Centaurus A/M83 Group of galaxies. It was discovered by John Herschel in 1835.

Distance measurements

At least two techniques have been used to measure the distance to NGC 5102. The surface brightness fluctuations distance measurement technique estimates distances to spiral galaxies based on the graininess of the appearance of their bulges.  The distance measured to NGC 5102 using this technique is 13.0 ± 0.8 Mly (4.0 ± 0.2 Mpc).  However, NGC 5102 is close enough that the tip of the red giant branch (TRGB) method may be used to estimate its distance.  The estimated distance to NGC 5102 using this technique is 11.1 ± 1.3 Mly (3.40 ± 0.39 Mpc).  Averaged together, these distance measurements give a distance estimate of 12.1 ± 0.7 Mly (3.70 ± 0.23 Mpc).

References

External links

Lenticular galaxies
Unbarred lenticular galaxies
Centaurus (constellation)
Centaurus A/M83 Group
5102
Astronomical objects discovered in 1835